Sir Brian David Hayes, GCB (5 May 1929 – 31 May 2022) was an English civil servant. Educated at Norwich School and Corpus Christi College, Cambridge, he joined the Ministry of Agriculture, Fisheries and Food in 1956 and was its Permanent Secretary from 1979 to 1983. He was then Permanent Secretary of the Department of Trade and Industry from 1983 to 1989, jointly until 1985. He subsequently held directorships at Guardian Royal Exchange, Tate and Lyle, and Unilever.

References 

1929 births
2022 deaths
English civil servants
People educated at Norwich School
Alumni of Corpus Christi College, Cambridge
Knights Grand Cross of the Order of the Bath